The national emblem of the Volga German Autonomous Soviet Socialist Republic was adopted in 1937 by the government of the Volga German Autonomous Soviet Socialist Republic. The emblem is identical to the emblem of the Russian Soviet Federative Socialist Republic.

History

First version

Second version 
On April 29, 1937, the second stage of the Extraordinary 10th Congress of Soviets of the Volga German ASSR adopted the Constitution of the Volga German Autonomous Soviet Socialist Republic. The Constitution was approved by the Law of the Russian SFSR on June 2, 1940. Article 110 of the constitution described the emblem of the Volga German ASSR :

On 7 May 1937, the Presidium of the Central Executive Committee of the Volga German ASSR adopted a decree "On the State Emblem of the Volga German Autonomous Soviet Socialist Republic":

The decree which depicted the emblem of the Volga German Autonomous Soviet Socialist Republic was published on July 10, 1937, on the front page of the newspaper Bolshevik.

The emblem was relinquished after the liquidation of the Volga German ASSR by the Decree of the Presidium of the Supreme Soviet of the USSR of August 28, 1941 "On the resettlement of Germans living in the Volga region".

Gallery

References 

Volga German Autonomous Soviet Socialist Republic
Volga German ASSR
Volga German ASSR
Volga German ASSR
Volga German ASSR
Volga German ASSR